In number theory, a pernicious number is a positive integer such that the Hamming weight of its binary representation is prime, that is, there is a prime number of 1's when it is written as a binary number.

Examples
The first pernicious number is 3, since 3 = 112 and 1 + 1 = 2, which is a prime. The next pernicious number is 5, since 5 = 1012, followed by 6 (1102), 7 (1112) and 9 (10012). The sequence of pernicious numbers begins

Properties
No power of two is a pernicious number. This is trivially true, because powers of two in binary form are represented as a one followed by zeros. So each power of two has a Hamming weight of one, and one is not considered to be a prime. This is because the sum of the digits in binary form is 2, which is a prime number.

A Mersenne number  has a binary representation consisting of  ones, and is pernicious when  is prime. Every Mersenne prime is a Mersenne number for prime , and is therefore pernicious. By the Euclid–Euler theorem, the even perfect numbers take the form  for a Mersenne prime ; the binary representation of such a number consists of a prime number  of ones, followed by  zeros. Therefore, every even perfect number is pernicious.

Related numbers
 Odious numbers are numbers with an odd number of 1s in their binary expansion.
 Evil numbers are numbers with an even number of 1s in their binary expansion.

References

Base-dependent integer sequences